The 2013 Federation Tournament of Champions took place at the Times Union Center in downtown Albany on March 22, 23 and 24. Federation championships were awarded in the AA, A and B classifications. Christ the King in Middle Village, Queens won the Class AA championship. Jon Severe of Christ the King was named the Class AA tournament's Most Valuable Player.

Class AA 

Participating teams, results and individual honors in Class AA were as follows:

Participating teams

Results 

Christ the King finished the season with a 27-3 record.

Individual honors 

The following players were awarded individual honors for their performances at the Federation Tournament:

Most Valuable Player 

 Jon Severe, Christ the King

All-Tournament Team 

 Rawle Alkins, Christ the King
 Antwoine Anderson, Bishop Kearney
 Kentan Facey, Long Island Lutheran
 Malik Harmon, Christ the King
 Isaiah Whitehead, Abraham Lincoln

Sportsmanship Award 

 Mical-Ryan Boyd, Long Island Lutheran

Class A 

Participating teams, results and individual honors in Class A were as follows:

Participating teams

Results 

Albany Academy finished the season with a 16-4 record.

Individual honors 

The following players were awarded individual honors for their performances at the Federation Tournament:

Most Valuable Player 

 Darrien White, Albany Academy

All-Tournament Team 

 Marcus Jackson, Albany Academy 
 Paul Johnson, John Adams
 Reyjzon Jordan, McKinley
 Jack Morrow, Albany Academy
 Samson Usilo, Nazareth

Sportsmanship Award 

 Markell French, John Adams

Class B 

Participating teams, results and individual honors in Class B were as follows:

Participating teams

Results 

Monsignor Scanlan finished the season with a 21-8 record.

Individual honors 

The following players were awarded individual honors for their performances at the Federation Tournament:

Most Valuable Player 

 John Dewey, Monsignor Scanlan

All-Tournament Team 

 Jordan Gleason, Watervliet
 Naje Green, Monsignor Scanlan
 George Pena, Monsignor Scanlan
 Thomas Ryan, Riverdale
 Isaiah Thomas, Fannie Lou Hamer Freedom

Sportsmanship Award 

 Corey Morgan, Fannie Lou Hamer Freedom

External links 

 http://www.nysbasketballbrackets.com/

References 

High school basketball competitions in the United States
High school sports in New York (state)
Sports competitions in Albany, New York
Basketball competitions in New York (state)
High
New York
New York state high school boys basketball championships